Yngvar Numme (born 1 October 1944 in Porsgrunn, Norway) is a Norwegian singer, actor, revue writer and director. He is particularly known for his central role in the show group Dizzie Tunes for about forty years, one of the most successful ensembles in Norwegian entertainment. He was awarded the Leonard Statuette in 1990, and Dizzie Tunes received the same award in 1993.

He also voiced in the animated film, "Løvenes Konge" (Norwegian version of The Lion King) and voiced for The Chronicler in the Norwegian dub for The Legend of Spyro: Dawn of the Dragon video game released in 2008. Numme is also father to Thomas Numme.

External links

References

1944 births
Living people
People from Porsgrunn
Norwegian male stage actors
Norwegian male voice actors
Norwegian male singers
Leonard Statuette winners
Norwegian male video game actors